Ian Cathcart (born 14 February 1982) is a New Zealand former professional basketball player and current head coach of the Waitaki Boys Basketball Academy.

Basketball career
Born in Oamaru, North Otago, Cathcart attended Waitaki Boys' High School from 1995 to 1999 and was part of the North Otago Penguins squad which won the Conference Basketball League (CBL) championship in 2000. He played in the NBL from 2000 to 2003 while at the same time attending and playing for Lyon College in Batesville, Arkansas from 2001 to 2005. He graduated from Lyon with a Bachelor of Business Administration majoring in Human Resource Management, and a Bachelor of Economics.

After playing in Ireland for the Shamrock Rovers in 2005–06, Cathcart returned to New Zealand and played locally in Oamaru. In 2008, the Penguins were resurrected after a seven-year hiatus with help from Cathcart, and the team re-entered the Conference Basketball League after dominating the Southern Inter-Association League. The Penguins finished third after defeating Wellington in the third-place playoff.

Cathcart later returned to the NBL when he signed with the Southland Sharks for the 2010 New Zealand NBL season. After playing in 18 games in 2010, he managed just one game for the Sharks in 2011.

Personal
Cathcart and his wife, Gemma, have a son named Boston (born 2011).

References

External links
Australiabasket.com profile
Southland Sharks player profile

1982 births
Living people
Nelson Giants players
New Zealand expatriate basketball people in Ireland
New Zealand men's basketball players
Otago Nuggets players
People educated at Waitaki Boys' High School
Sportspeople from Oamaru
Shooting guards
Southland Sharks players